Joseph Bulcock (April 1879 – 20 April 1918) was an English professional footballer, best remembered for his five years as a right back in the Southern League with Crystal Palace, for whom he made over 140 appearances. Earlier in his career, he played in the Football League for Bury and for a number of non-League clubs. He represented the Southern League XI and the Football Association XI.

Personal life 
Bulcock was the youngest of three brothers. After professional football was suspended at the end of the 1914–15 season due to the ongoing First World War, he lived in Llanelli and worked as a plumber's mate. Bulcock enlisted as a private in the Welch Regiment in December 1915 and was sent to the Western Front in September 1917. He was wounded at the Fourth Battle of Ypres and died of wounds to the head at 36th Casualty Clearing Station in Watten, France on 20 April 1918. Bulcock was buried in Haringhe (Bandaghem) Military Cemetery, Belgium.

Honours 
Colne
 Lancashire Junior Cup: 1905–06

References

1879 births
1918 deaths
Military personnel from Lancashire
Footballers from Burnley
English footballers
English Football League players
Association football fullbacks
British Army personnel of World War I
Welch Regiment soldiers
British military personnel killed in World War I
Brynn Central F.C. players
Burnley F.C. players
Aston Villa F.C. players
Bacup Borough F.C. players
Trawden Forest F.C. players
Bury F.C. players
Macclesfield Town F.C. players
Exeter City F.C. players
Crystal Palace F.C. players
Swansea City A.F.C. players
Southern Football League representative players
Southern Football League players